Marion Gilman Osgood (1859–c. 1948) was an American violinist, composer, and orchestra conductor. She established her own company, the Marion Osgood's Ladies Orchestra, which was the first ladies' orchestra organized for professional work in the United States. She was one of the leading solo violinists in the country.

Biography 

Marion G. Osgood was born in Chelsea, Massachusetts. Her father was associated as a teacher with Lowell Mason, and her mother, Mary A. Osgood, was an author and music composer. George L. Osgood, a Boston musician, was her cousin, and her brother was Professor Fletcher Osgood, elocutionist. She began her musical life as a child, coming from a musical and scholarly family.

Osgood worked as a violin teacher in Boston and was one of the leading solo violinists in the US. She composed and published a number of vocal and instrumental pieces, was a scholarly writer regarding art, and met with local success as a writer of short stories in romantic fiction. Osgood organized and conducted the ladies' orchestra which bore her name. This company was established by her in 1884, was composed wholly of women artists, numbered 30 pieces, and was thoroughly organized with brass and wood winds, strings, and tympana. This company was the first ladies' orchestra for professional work in the US; it existed for about ten years. Among her many published works are a "Fantaisie Caprice", an album of descriptive pieces for violin and piano, and the song "Loving and Loved".

Notes

References

Attribution

Further reading 

 

1860s births
Year of death missing
American violinists
American composers
Orchestra leaders
Women classical violinists
People from Chelsea, Massachusetts
American romantic fiction writers
Women romantic fiction writers
American music educators
Women music educators
Wikipedia articles incorporating text from A Woman of the Century
Founders of early music ensembles
Women founders
Women conductors (music)